KGKL (960 AM) is a radio station broadcasting a sports format.  Licensed to San Angelo, Texas, United States, the station serves the San Angelo area.  The station is currently owned by Townsquare Media and before September 1, 2020; featured programming from Premiere Radio Networks, WestwoodOne, Dave Ramsey, and Compass Media Networks. Bill Lockwood's American Liberty program, based at News/Talk 1290 in Wichita Falls, also aired on News/Talk 960 before the format change to sports. The station was awarded a construction permit on March 9, 2020 to become a Class D station, reducing power at night from 1,000 to 116 watts.

One of the oldest continuous programs in Texas airs on KGKL AM, the San Angelo Businessmen & Women's Bible Class has aired every Sunday on KGKL AM since 1932.

In May 2020, Robert Snyder, Regional News/Talk/Sports Director of Content for the Texas Townsquare Media Network, became the operations manager for KGKL (AM).

On September 1, 2020, KGKL changed their format from news/talk to sports, branded as "ESPN 960", with programming from ESPN Radio. Ryan Hyatt's Raiderland featuring Rob Breaux also airs on ESPN 960, it is based at Talk 1340 in Lubbock.

References

External links

Sports radio stations in the United States
GKL
Townsquare Media radio stations
ESPN Radio stations